Tibor Cimbal (born 26 May 1962) is a former Serbian footballer.

Career
Born in Novi Sad, FPR Yugoslavia, he played with FK Vojvodina and OFK Kikinda in Yugoslavia. Later he moved to France.

References

External links
Vojvodina season 
Vojvodina season 
1985/86 Cup match info  
Article 

1962 births
Living people
Serbian footballers
Yugoslav footballers
FK Vojvodina players
OFK Kikinda players
Yugoslav First League players
Association football midfielders